Péone (；) is a commune in the Alpes-Maritimes department in southeastern France.

The Valberg ski resort is, in part, located on this town.

Population

See also
Communes of the Alpes-Maritimes department

References

Communes of Alpes-Maritimes
Alpes-Maritimes communes articles needing translation from French Wikipedia